Pelucia Creek is a stream in the U.S. state of Mississippi. It is a tributary to the Yazoo River.

Pelucia is a name derived from the Choctaw language purported to mean "flying squirrels are there".

References

Rivers of Mississippi
Rivers of Carroll County, Mississippi
Rivers of Leflore County, Mississippi
Mississippi placenames of Native American origin